Luxemburgia is a genus of flowering plants belonging to the family Ochnaceae.

It is native to Brazil.

The genus name of Luxemburgia is in honour of Charles Emmanuel Sigismond de Montmorency-Luxembourg (1774–1861), French duke of Piney-Luxembourg and also a botanical patron. It was first described and published in Mém. Mus. Hist. Nat. Vol.9 on page 352 in 1822.

Species
According to Kew:

Luxemburgia angustifolia 
Luxemburgia bracteata 
Luxemburgia ciliatibracteata 
Luxemburgia ciliosa 
Luxemburgia corymbosa 
Luxemburgia damazioana 
Luxemburgia diciliata 
Luxemburgia flexuosa 
Luxemburgia furnensis 
Luxemburgia glazioviana 
Luxemburgia hatschbachiana 
Luxemburgia leitonii 
Luxemburgia macedoi 
Luxemburgia mogolensis 
Luxemburgia mysteriosa 
Luxemburgia nobilis 
Luxemburgia octandra 
Luxemburgia polyandra 
Luxemburgia schwackeana 
Luxemburgia speciosa

References

Ochnaceae
Malpighiales genera
Plants described in 1822
Flora of Brazil